Judy A. Brown (born 1956) is a New Zealand academic. She is currently a full professor at the Victoria University of Wellington.

Academic career

Brown did a 1995 PhD thesis titled  'Accounting and Industrial Relations: a Critical Theory Perspective'  at Victoria University of Wellington, before rising to full professor. Her research interests are the social and political context of accounting, including industrial relations, corporate governance, sustainability assessment, critical theory and social accounting.

Brown received a six-year FRST grant for 'Building Capacity for Sustainable Development' and then a $685,000 of Marsden grant for 'Dialogic Accounting: The Challenge of Taking Multiple Perspectives Seriously'.

Selected works 
 Brown, Judy, and Jesse Dillard. "Dialogic accountings for stakeholders: On opening up and closing down participatory governance." Journal of Management Studies 52, no. 7 (2015): 961–985.
 Brown, Judy, and Jesse Dillard. "Integrated reporting: On the need for broadening out and opening up." Accounting, Auditing & Accountability Journal 27, no. 7 (2014): 1120–1156.
 Blackburn, Nivea, Judy Brown, Jesse Dillard, and Val Hooper. "A dialogical framing of AIS–SEA design." International Journal of Accounting Information Systems 15, no. 2 (2014): 83–101.
 Brown, Judy, and Jesse Dillard. "Agonizing over engagement: SEA and the "death of environmentalism" debates." Critical Perspectives on Accounting 24, no. 1 (2013): 1-18.
 Brown, Judy, and Jesse Dillard. "Critical accounting and communicative action: On the limits of consensual deliberation." Critical Perspectives on Accounting 24, no. 3 (2013): 176–190.

References

Living people
New Zealand women academics
Victoria University of Wellington alumni
Academic staff of the Victoria University of Wellington
New Zealand accountants
Recipients of Marsden grants
1956 births
New Zealand women writers